= Pallimon =

- village
- Location in Kerala, India Pallimon (India)
- Coordinates: 8°54′0″N 76°42′50″E
- Country: India
- State: Kerala
- District: Kollam
- Named for: Serine land

Government
  - Type: Panchayath

Population (2011)
  - Total: 20,677

Languages
  - Official: Malayalam, English
- Time zone: UTC+5:30 (IST)
- Postal code: 691576
- Vehicle registration: KL-24
- Nearest city: Kollam City

Pallimon is a village in Kollam district in the state of Kerala, India.

== Demographics ==
At the 2011 India census, Pallimon had a population of 20,677 (7,429 males and 8z303 females).
